Peggy V. Beck is an American author known for her research on fool archetypes and ritual clowns.  She has written about the Fool as a psychopomp, a guide who reveals the chaotic logic of the universe by way of creative double binds, nonsense and dreams.  Her research on ritual clowns includes studies of masked figures in Africa, North America, South America and Europe. She received her PhD in the History of Consciousness in 1974 from the University of California, Santa Cruz, under the direction of Gregory Bateson, whose own work was predicated on the idea that "the lunatic, the lover, and the poet/Are of imagination all compact"1

She did fieldwork on the intersection of "seers" and humor in San Juan Cotzocon, Mixe, Oaxaca, Mexico in 1974.  Beck worked on the Navajo Nation from 1974–1978 where she developed Navajo-based curriculum and texts in Native American studies.  She taught humanities at the University of New Mexico and at New Mexico Highlands University from 1979–1983.

In 1987 Peggy Beck received a National Endowment Folk Arts Award to record and film rural Spanish musicians, poets, and masqueraders who participate in midwinter rituals and feasts unique to northern New Mexico.  The far reaches of the Spanish frontier along the Rio Grande into Colorado harbored Crypto-Jewish families who, like Pueblo Indian religions, were forced, by the Spanish Inquisition, to hide or disguise their religious practices.  Beck's documentation of the "aguelos", masked animal-like, whip-carrying ogres who would appear around bonfires called "luminarias", reveals not only Indian-Spanish-Basque dramatic hybridization, but also the possibility that, in the past, "aguelos" were secretly observing the Jewish Festival of Lights.  The materials for this project are archived in the Library of Congress.

Peggy Beck's academic work is focused on a reconsideration of so-called Tricksters and the trickster genre.  Tricksters are characterized by their male gender, their violence towards women, their misogyny and their ubiquitous role is usurping women's physical and cultural domains.  These pathologies stem in part from the limitations imposed on the trickster genre by its mainly androcentric interpreters.2 Beck reinterprets this world-view in the light of feminist scholarship in anthropology and the history of religions.

Peggy Beck is a published poet whose current manuscript is ''Fox Went Out,a cycle of poetry that traces the topographies over which a Gray fox wanders and the elements by which she navigates her changing world. The poems are meditations on the language of wildness and the unspooling of patterns and cycles in the natural world as a result of human folly and forgetfulness. he lives in New Mexico and has written under the names Ailm Travler, P. V. Beck, Maggy V. Beck and Peg Beck.

Selected work 
“Bear Awakes,” Tiny Seed Journal;“The Fall,” Western Humanities Review;“Lizard Moon,” Fourteen Hills; “The Last Wave,” Manzano Mountain Review; “Unbroken Circle,” California Quarterly; “Adrift,” “We Are Made of Stars,” Cloudbank 13;“First Blood,” “Circle, Square, Triangle,” “Gathering,” The RavensPerch; “Restless,” Grey Sparrow;“Markings,” “Changes,” Tule Review;“Intimations” Ponder Review; “Migrations,” “This Old Earth,” Canary; “Out of Place,” “The Seam of Time,” “Rivers,” Quills Edge Press anthology, 50/50; “Fox at the Edge of Winter,” Hummingbird; “Barbed Wire Fences,” Pilgrimage; “Fox Wanders in a Parched Land,” “Drought,” “Counting the Days,” “Storm,” DASH Literary;“In the Deep Midwinter,” Blue Lyra Review; “Ice Frogs,” Camas.

(Editor)The Mighty Branches of the Heart: Home Poems, Maeve Butler Beck: Tamarack River Press. 2015

(2009) Sweet Turnaround J. Fairfield, CA: Bedazzled Ink Publishers. (A young adult girls' basketball novel by P.V. Beck)

(2007) "Aguelos: Guardians of Forbidden Traditions", The Taos News, Taos, New Mexico

(1995) “Run-off.”  In, A Different Angle: Fly-fishing Stories by Women. Seattle: Seal Press.  (Ailm Travler.)

(1991) “Fly Fishing Folly.” In, Uncommon Waters.”  Seattle: Seal Press. (Ailm Travler)

(1990)(With Nia Francisco and Anna Walters) The Sacred: Ways of Knowledge, Sources of life. Flagstaff: Northland Press and Navajo Community College Press.

(1995) "The Beauty of Innuendos."  Parabola XX (3)

(1991) "Wild Trout."  Parabola XVI (2) (P.V. Beck)

(1987) Oremos, Oremos: New Mexican Midwinter Masquerades.  Taos: Millicent Rogers Museum,

(1986)  Hustler in Hero’s Clothing: a reevaluation of trickster mythologies.  (2011 Revision pending) Baltimore: American Folklore Society Annual Meeting.

(1986) “In the Company of Laughter.” Parabola XI (3

(1982) "Red Fox X", Red Bass 2 (2) (Maggy V. Beck)

(1978) “The Fool and the Beginning of Wisdom.” In, Ecology and Consciousness, Richard Grossinger, Ed. Richmond, CA: North Atlantic Books.

(1977) "Love Change", "Madness Contained and Our Gestures", "Coyote", "Cuirana", "Untitled", Open Spaces No. 23, Spring/Summer 1977  (Peg Beck)

Notes

References 
Franchot Ballinger, "Living Sideways:  Tricksters in American Indian Oral Traditions", 2004.  Lewis Hyde, "Trickster Makes This World"  Barry Lopez, "Giving Birth to Thunder, Sleeping with His Daughter, Coyote Builds America".  1977.  Robert Pelton, "The Trickster in West Africa", 1980.  Paul Radin, "The Trickster", 1956.
William Shakespeare, "A Midsummer Night's Dream", Act 5, Scene 1

American women writers
Living people
University of California, Santa Cruz alumni
Year of birth missing (living people)
21st-century American women